Ashfaq Ahmed (1925–2004) was a writer, playwright and broadcaster from Pakistan.

Ashfaq Ahmed can also refer to:

 Ashfaq Ahmed (hockey player) (1946–2005), Pakistani hockey player
 Ashfaq Ahmed (cricketer, born 1973), Pakistani former Test cricketer
 Ashfaq Ahmed (cricketer, born 1987), Pakistani cricketer
 Ashfaq Ahmed (Emirati cricketer), Emirati cricketer
 Ashfaq Ahmad, Indian Writer and Blogger